3,5-Dihydroxyphenylpropionoic acid is a metabolite of alkylresorcinols, first identified in human urine and can be quantified in urine and plasma, and may be an alternative, equivalent biomarker of whole grain wheat intake.

References 

Phenolic human metabolites
Propionic acids
Resorcinols